Göran Erik Stenius (9 July 1909, Viipuri – 21 June 2000, Helsinki) was a Swedish Finnish  journalist, official in the  Foreign Ministry and writer.

Stenius undergraduate as student in 1927 and graduated as a Bachelor of Philosophy in 1935. As a journalist, he worked  from 1933  to 1941 and was employed by the Information Center of the Council of State from 1940 to 1941 and was the Information Center's  Representative in Stockholm from 1941 to 1942.

Duringh his service in the Ministry for Foreign Affairs  Stenius was the  Chargé d'Affaires to the Holy See from 1947 to 1951, and a Secretary in the Ministry from 1951 to 1965 and Head of Division in 1965 and Counselor in London from 1969 to 1973. Stenius got the  title of  professor in 1995.

Stenius books are mainly about Karelia. The book Femte Akten, published in 1937, tells about Olavi Paavolainen’s visit to Nazi Germany with Stenius. Klockorna i Rom (1955) was an international success.

Stenius was a convert to Catholicism.


References

Works cited

Notes

External links
 Stenius, Göran at Biografiskt lexikon för Finland (in Swedish).
 Stenius, Göran at Uppslagsverket Finland (in Swedish).

Swedish-speaking Finns
Diplomats  from Vyborg
Writers from Vyborg
1909 births
2000 deaths
20th-century Finnish journalists
Finnish Roman Catholics